M. rex  may refer to:
 Megalopanax rex, a flowering plant species endemic to Cuba
 Melanocharacidium rex, a species of South American darter
 Meriones rex, the king jird, a rodent species found in Saudi Arabia and Yemen
 Mormula rex, a species of sea snail
 Mylomys rex, the Ethiopian mylomys, a rodent species found only in Ethiopia
 Myodes rex, the Hokkaido red-backed vole, a rodent species found only in Japan
M. Rex, a comic book series that inspired Generator Rex.

See also
 Rex (disambiguation)